The 1983–84 Libyan Premier League was the 17th edition of the competition since its inception in 1963. The 16 competing teams were split into two groups of 8. The top team in each group advanced to a one-off playoff match to decide the championship. The bottom club in each club was relegated.

Overview
In Group A, Nasr won the group by one point from Ittihad, while in Group B, Ahly Tripoli won their group on goal difference from Ahly Benghazi.

In the final, held at the 11 June Stadium, Ahly Tripoli defeated Nasr 1–0, and in doing so, won their 6th national championship.

Group stage

Group A

Group B

Final
Played at 11 June Stadium, Tripoli on July 6, 1984
Ahly Tripoli 1–0 Nasr

Ahly Tripoli therefore win the Libyan Premier League and qualified for the 1983 African Cup of Champions Clubs. As there was no Libyan Cup competition at this time, Nasr qualified for the 1983 African Cup Winners' Cup.

References
Libya - List of final tables (RSSSF)

Libyan Premier League seasons
1
Libya